Seven Murders for Scotland Yard (Spanish:Jack el destripador de Londres / Jack the Ripper of London) is a 1971 Italian-Spanish giallo film directed by José Luis Madrid and starring Paul Naschy, Patricia Loran and Renzo Marignano. Naschy and Madrid wrote the screenplay, Tito Carpi's name was simply added to the credits to satisfy the requirements for a Spanish-Italian co-production. The film was shot in June 1971, and was first released in Italy in 1971 as Sette Cadaveri per Scotland Yard / Seven Corpses for Scotland Yard. It was shown in Spain on July 10, 1972 as Jack el destripador de Londres, and finally wound up theatrically released in the U.S. in 1976 as Seven Murders for Scotland Yard. The Mexican one-sheet poster simply called the film Jack el distripador/ Jack the Ripper.

Plot
Paul Naschy plays Bruno Doriani, an ex-acrobat living in London who limps badly as a result of an accident he suffered years before on the trapeze. Bruno's life has slid downhill, and he hangs out in seedy pubs and dates tarts and prostitutes. When a number of call girls begin turning up brutally murdered, the police led by Inspector Campbell seek to uncover the identity of the mad slasher, whom they nickname Jack the Ripper after the notorious serial killer from the late 1800s. Paul becomes a suspect in the eyes of the police, as he had personal connections to one or two of the victims. Inspector Campbell (Renzo Marignano) himself turns out to be the killer, as Bruno discovers when he follows the police chief down into his underground dungeon of horrors, where the inspector keeps certain body parts from his victims in jars as mementos. But the mystery of this film is not simply who the killer is, but rather why he is performing these hideous murders.

Cast
 Paul Naschy as Bruno Doriani  
 Patricia Loran as Lulu  
 Renzo Marignano as Inspector Henry Campbell  
 Orchidea De Santis as Sandy Christian  
 Andrés Resino as Winston Darby Christian  
 Irene Mir as Belinda  
 Franco Borelli as Detective Hawkins  
 Víctor Iregua 
 Teresita Castizio 
 Carmen Roger as Violeta  
 Palomba Moreno as Senorita Sanders  
 Víctor Vilanova as McMurdo  
 Maika as Prostitute 
 Miguel Muniesa as Superintendent Chambers 
 Isidro Novellas as Mile  
 Alfonso Castizo as Robert  
 Antonio Ramis 
 Enrique Beltrán

Critiques
Film historian Troy Howarth opines that although the film's murders are presented in a lurid manner, the bulk of the film is directed by Merino in a lackluster manner, which undercuts Naschy's interesting script. Also he felt too much screen time was allotted to police procedure and not enough to Naschy.  He did find that the score by Piero Piccioni added to the film's suspense.

References

Bibliography
 Antonio Lazaro-Reboll. Spanish Horror Film. Edinburgh University Press, 2012.

External links 

1971 films
Italian horror films
Italian crime films
Films about cannibalism
Spanish horror films
1971 horror films
Spanish crime films
1970s crime films
1970s Spanish-language films
Films directed by José Luis Madrid
Films set in London
Films about Jack the Ripper
Films scored by Piero Piccioni
Giallo films
1970s Italian films